Benigno may refer to:

Surname
Francesco Benigno (born 1967), Italian actor
Joe Benigno (born 1953), American sports radio personality
Teodoro Benigno (1923–2005), Filipino journalist

Given name
Benigno Aquino Sr. (1894–1947), Filipino politician and Speaker of the Second Philippine Republic National Assembly from 1943 to 1944
Benigno Aquino Jr. (1932–1983), Philippine Senator, son of Benigno Sr., and governor of Tarlac
Benigno Aquino III (1960–2021), Filipino politician, son of Benigno Jr., and president of the Philippines
Paolo Benigno Aquino IV (born 1977), Filipino politician, nephew of Benigno Jr.
Benigno Perez (born 1990), Filipino model, TV host and actor
Benigno Zaccagnini (1912-1989), Italian politician and physician
Other
Benigno & Roberts, show hosted by Joe Benigno
San Benigno Canavese a municipality in the province of Turin

See also
Benign
Benigni (disambiguation)
Benignus (disambiguation)